Dorian Smith (born August 19, 1985) is an American former professional football player who was a defensive lineman in the Canadian Football League (CFL).

Undrafted after two years at Oregon State University, Smith spent three weeks on the Winnipeg Blue Bombers' practice roster in 2008. On February 27, 2009, Smith signed as a free agent with the Blue Bombers and played 36 games for the blue and gold. He recorded 8 sacks in his rookie season in 2009 and was the Bombers in 2010 when they led the CFL in sacks.

Smith signed as a free agent with the Stampeders on August 4, 2012.

Dorian currently works for the Educational Opportunities Program at Oregon State University.  He coordinates Black Access and Success efforts for OSU.

External links
Winnipeg Blue Bombers bio
Calgary Stampeders bio

1985 births
Living people
Players of American football from Los Angeles
Canadian football defensive linemen
Oregon State Beavers football players
Winnipeg Blue Bombers players
Calgary Stampeders players
American players of Canadian football
Players of Canadian football from Los Angeles